Campylospermum oliveri is a species of plant in the Ochnaceae family. It is endemic to Cameroon.  Its natural habitat is subtropical or tropical moist lowland forests. It is threatened by habitat loss.

References

oliveri
Flora of Cameroon
Vulnerable plants
Taxonomy articles created by Polbot